Stemmacantha is a genus of Asian plants in the thistle tribe within the daisy family.

 Species

 formerly included
numerous species now considered members of Rhaponticum

References 

Asteraceae genera
Cynareae